uniq is a Unix utility to remove adjacent repetitions of lines.

Uniq may also refer to:
 UNIQ, a nightclub in Helsinki, Finland
 UNIQ summer school, a summer school provided by the University of Oxford, UK, to support undergraduate access
 UniQ, a collection of queer student groups at universities/polytechs throughout New Zealand
 UNIQ, a Mongolian computer brand
 Uniq (band), a Chinese-South Korean boy group
 U-Niq (born 1976), Dutch rapper
 Uniq plc, a chilled convenience food manufacturer in the UK
 Ugli fruit, a citrus fruit sometimes called uniq fruit
 uniQ (university), Quisqueya University in Haiti

See also
 Unique (disambiguation)